Jang Jun is a South Korean taekwondo practitioner. He won the gold medal at the 2018 Asian Taekwondo Championships on the -54 kg weight category, and has won two World Taekwondo Grand Prix titles in 2018.
He has been licensed to compete in the Tokyo Olympics.

He won the silver medal in the men's flyweight event at the 2022 World Taekwondo Championships held in Guadalajara, Mexico.

References 

Living people
South Korean male taekwondo practitioners
World Taekwondo Championships medalists
Asian Taekwondo Championships medalists
Korea National Sport University alumni
2000 births
Taekwondo practitioners at the 2020 Summer Olympics
Medalists at the 2020 Summer Olympics
Olympic bronze medalists for South Korea
Olympic medalists in taekwondo
Olympic taekwondo practitioners of South Korea
21st-century South Korean people